The A1 is a motorway in Switzerland. It follows Switzerland's main east–west axis, from St. Margrethen in northeastern Switzerland's canton of St. Gallen through to Geneva in southwestern Switzerland. The motorway spans 383 km (240 mi). Besides the motorway's main route, it has several branches that are variously numbered A1a, A1h, A1l and A1.1. It was opened for the Swiss national exhibition of 1964.

After the construction of the third Baregg Tunnel tube, the traffic jams in this area were reduced, but the Gubrist Tunnel remains with the old capacity as a new point of heavy traffic. 
The A1 motorway is connected via a taxiway at the hangar 5 with the airfield of Payerne Air Base and can, if necessary, used as runway for take off - and landing. However, this possibility has never been used since the construction of the highway.

Exit list

See also
 Transportation in Switzerland

References

External links

A01
A01